Rhodocollybia maculata, also known as the Spotted Toughshank, is a species of basidiomycete fungus in the family Marasmiaceae. It often appears in decomposing conifer duff. R. maculata is a source of collybolide, a sesquiterpenoid containing a furyl-ẟ-lactone motif reminiscent of salvinorin A.

Description
The cap is cream-colored with red-brown spots. The edge remains inrolled for an extended period of time. The whitish gills are crowded, becoming spotted in age. The similarly colored stipe is long, tough, hollow, and tapered downwards.

A variety known as scorzonerea is characterized by yellowish color of its gills, and sometimes the stipe.

Edibility
Though non-toxic, this species is considered inedible due to its toughness and unpalatability; it is typically bitter.

Kappa-opioid receptor agonism 
In 2016, Gupta et al. reported that collybolide exhibited high-potency, selective kappa-opioid receptor (KOR) agonism. Due to its attractive bioactivity and chemical similarity to salvinorin A, collybolide garnered attention in the synthetic chemistry and pharmacology fields as a potential scaffold for developing next-generation analgesics, antipruritics, and antidepressants.

In 2022, Shevick et al. completed the first enantioselective total synthesis of collybolide and profiled the activity of synthetic collybolide at the KOR. Despite previous findings by Gupta et al., these assays showed that neither enantiomer of collybolide had KOR activity. The synthetic sample was identical to natural collybolide isolated from R. maculata. Assays of crude R. maculata extracts by other groups additionally showed no KOR activity. These assays of synthetic and natural samples contradict the findings of Gupta et al., and suggest that collybolide and the other constituents of R. maculata have no activity at KOR.

Gallery

Notes

References

External links 

 Images

Fungi of North America
Marasmiaceae
Rhodocollybia
Taxa named by Johannes Baptista von Albertini
Taxa named by Lewis David de Schweinitz